"Walk on the Ocean" is a song by American alternative rock group Toad the Wet Sprocket from their third studio album, Fear (1991). Two different versions of the song were released: the album version with a cold ending (timed at 2:59) and the single version with the chorus repeated until fade (timed at 3:32). Commercially, "Walk on the Ocean" peaked at number 18 on the US Billboard Hot 100 and reached the top 40 in Canada, New Zealand, and Norway.

Composition
The song was written after singer Glen Phillips and his wife were vacationing on Orcas Island in Washington's San Juan Islands after hanging "out at Doe Bay hot springs with a bunch of hippies." The lyrics were written as placeholders, but Phillips could not come up with anything better. "I wrote down literally the first thing that came across my mind. The lyric and the chorus, I have no idea what it means, unfortunately. Then I tried rewriting it and nothing ever really worked. I tried to make the chorus mean something, and eventually said, 'Well, it sounds like I know what I'm talking about.' So we just left it as is. It was the least-conscious, least-crafted lyric," he said.

Track listings
US CD and cassette single
 "Walk on the Ocean" (single version) – 3:32
 "All in All" – 4:02
 "Walk on the Ocean" (album version) – 2:59

European CD and cassette single
 "Walk on the Ocean" (single version) – 3:32 
 "All in All" – 4:02

Charts

Use in media
The song appears on the soundtrack of the 2013 American film Jobs. The song appears on the soundtrack of the 2014 American film Adult Beginners. The song appears on the soundtrack of the 2015 American television series Hindsight.

References

Toad the Wet Sprocket songs
1991 songs
1992 singles
Columbia Records singles
Songs written by Glen Phillips (singer)
Songs written by Todd Nichols (musician)